Ketoprak is an Indonesian vegetarian dish from Jakarta, consisting of tofu, vegetables, rice cake, and rice vermicelli served in peanut sauce.

Etymology and origin
The etymology of the name ketoprak is actually closely related to Javanese folk-drama. During the Great Depression in 1930 - 1931, ketoprak viewership was dwindling. Djojosoekarno, a member of Javanese ketoprak troupe "Langenhardjo" in Jakarta, started selling a dish made of tofu mixed with bean sprouts and sweet soy sauce on stalls for extra income. Due to his popularity as ketoprak performer, customers usually referred to him as "Bang Ketoprak" (lit. "Mr. Ketoprak") and as time passes, his specialty dish is known as ketoprak on itself.  However, this story was largely told orally and eventually forgotten. 

As time went on, various modifications are added to the dish including ketupat as substitute of rice and peanut sauce. In late 2000s, a backronym for ketoprak went into popularity, derived from the acronym of its ingredients and process; which are ket from ketupat, to from toge, and prak from digeprak (Betawi for: "mashed" or "crushed"), which describes the method on grounding garlic, chili pepper and peanut granules together to create the peanut sauce.

Ingredients

Ketoprak consists of sliced fried tofu, steamed rice cake (lontong or ketupat), sliced cabbage and cucumber, bihun (thin rice vermicelli), bean sprouts, served in peanut sauce, topped with krupuk and fried shallots. The fried tofu can be considered as the centerpiece of the dish, since it is freshly fried directly after customer placed their order, to ensure its freshness and hotness.

The peanut sauce is made from ground peanut and palm sugar made into a thick paste, mixed with garlic, chili pepper, salt and also kecap manis (sweet soy sauce).

Serving

Ketoprak is a typical street food. It was originally popular around the Jakarta area but has spread throughout Java. The seller prepares the ingredients at home and mixes them in front of the customers as they place their orders. It is sold in individual portions from small stalls or carts along the street. The cook usually asks the customer their preference on the degree of spiciness: mild, medium, hot or extra hot. The spiciness corresponds to the amount of chili used. The price range is about IDR 8.000 to 15.000 according to outlets and ingredients included. Sometimes, hard boiled egg might be added.

Similar dishes
Ketoprak is nearly similar to kupat tahu, lotek and karedok from West Java, gado-gado from Jakarta and also pecel from Central Java, although the ingredients in the peanut sauces are slightly different. Gado-gado and karedok use only brown sugar for sweetening, but in ketoprak sweet soy sauce is used for additional sweetener, and ground garlic is added. There is also a similar dish from neighboring Singapore called Satay bee hoon.

See also

 Gado-gado

References

Culture of Jakarta
Betawi cuisine
Vegetarian dishes of Indonesia
Vegetable dishes of Indonesia
Vegetarian dishes of Singapore
Vegetable dishes of Singapore
Street food in Indonesia